WITH is a radio station serving Ithaca, New York and the surrounding area. It is owned in a partnership between Rochester's WXXI Public Broadcasting Council and Hobart and William Smith Colleges and went on the air on May 24, 2010. WITH broadcasts in HD, with a AAA music format, and has a full-time classical service on WITH HD-2

References

External links
WITH-FM Official Site

ITH
Radio stations established in 2010
NPR member stations
Mass media in Ithaca, New York
2010 establishments in New York (state)
Adult album alternative radio stations in the United States
Hobart and William Smith Colleges